The attack on Prekaz, also known as the Prekaz massacre, was an operation led by the Special Anti-Terrorism Unit of Serbia on 5 March 1998, to capture Kosovo Liberation Army (KLA) fighters deemed terrorists by Serbia. During the operation, KLA leader Adem Jashari and his brother Hamëz were killed, along with nearly 60 other family members.

The attack was criticized by Amnesty International, which wrote in its report that: "all evidence suggests that the attack was not intended to apprehend armed Albanians, but to eliminate the suspects and their families." Serbia, on the other hand, claimed the raid was due to KLA attacks on police outposts.

Background

Adem and Hamëz Jashari were members of the Kosovo Liberation Army (KLA), a militant group of ethnic Albanians that sought the independence of Kosovo from Yugoslavia. Adem Jashari was responsible for organizing the first armed political formation in Srbica or Skënderaj, in 1991.

Pursuing Adem Jashari for the murder of a Serbian policeman, Serbian forces again attempted to assault the Jashari compound in Prekaz on 22 January 1998. On 28 February, a firefight erupted between Albanian militants and a Serbian police patrol in the small village of Likošane. Four Serbian policemen were killed and several were injured. The KLA militants, one of whom was Adem Jashari, escaped. Subsequently, Serbian police killed thirteen people in a nearby household. Later that same day, Serbian policemen attacked the neighbouring village of Ćirez and subsequently killed 26 Albanians. However, the Albanian militants managed to escape and the police decided to move in on Adem Jashari and his family. In the Drenica valley, Jashari decided to stay in his home and he instructed his fighters to stay there as well and resist to the last man.

Operation
On 5 March 1998, the KLA launched another attack on a police patrol in Donji Prekaz, which caused the Serbian police to seek retribution, according to the official Serbian public report. After the second attack, the police prepared a brutal response for the Jasharis. They started hunting down local KLA militants who were forced to retreat to Jashari's compound in the same village.

Yugoslav policemen surrounded the group and invited them to surrender, while urging all other persons to clear the premises. The police further alleged that they gave them two hours to comply. Within the given deadline, dozens of civilians complied with the order and dispersed in safety from the stronghold. According to the police, after the two-hour deadline had expired, Adem Jashari, his brother and most of his family-members, however still refused to comply and remained inside the compound. After a tense verbal stand-off, according to official Serbian statements, Jashari's group responded by firing on the police using automatic weapons as well as mortars, hand grenades and snipers, killing two and injuring three policemen.

In the ensuing violence, the Yugoslav police killed more than sixty people, including both Jashari brothers. The only survivor was Besarta Jashari, Hamëz Jashari's daughter. She claimed that the policemen had "threatened her with a knife and ordered her to say that her uncle (Adem Jashari) had killed everyone who wanted to surrender." Goran Radosavljević, a major in the Serbian Interior Ministry, claimed that "Adem Jashari used women, children and the elderly as hostages...". Yugoslav Army General Nebojša Pavković stated that "It was a normal policing action against a well-known criminal. It was successful. The other details I don't remember".

Evidence gathered later showed that the attack wasn't intended to apprehend of armed Albanian "militants"; rather, the attack was to eliminate them and their families. Other houses of Jashari family members were also attacked by the police as well as the residential compound of the Lushtaku family. In response, the UN security council turned to Chapter VII of the United Nations Charter without authorizing the final measure of the chapter which was military intervention.

Burial 
The local Council for the Defense of Human Rights and Freedoms was contacted by the police to collect the bodies, but when the council requested documentation about the deceased none was made public. According to the council, the police had moved the corpses to a Pristina morgue before returning them to the Drenica area. On 9 March, the police warned that if the bodies weren't buried by their families they would be buried by the authorities, while the families requested autopsies to be performed.

On 10 March, the police got a bulldozer and dug a mass grave near Prekaz, and buried the bodies, ten of which were still unidentified at that time. Families had hoped that autopsies might be performed, but a group of doctors from Pristina, the families of the deceased, representatives from the Catholic Church, the Muslim community and international human rights organizations were denied access to the area. The heads of the Serbian police accused the organizations that they had smuggled weapons into the region in the past. On 11 March, the bodies were reburied according to Islamic tradition.

Forty-two individuals, Albanians, were identified to have died in Donji Prekaz during the operation. Six Albanians died in the nearby village of Lauša under unclear circumstances.

Aftermath

The shootout at the Jashari family compound involving Adem Jashari, a KLA commander and surrounding Yugoslav troops in 1998 resulted in the massacre of most Jashari family members. The deaths of Jashari and his family generated an international backlash against the Federal Republic of Yugoslavia. The Prekaz attack led to a rapid increase of the KLA's popularity among ethnic-Albanians and village militias were formed in many parts of Kosovo. As news of the killings spread, armed Kosovo Albanian militias emerged throughout Kosovo, seeking to avenge Jashari's death as Albanians flocked to join the KLA. The event became a rallying call for KLA recruitment regarding armed resistance to Yugoslav forces.

After the event, Adem Jashari himself was portrayed as a "terrorist" in the Yugoslav media, while the Albanian media depicted him as a "freedom fighter". The casualties of the attack would be described as the fall of "martyrs" in the Albanian media, while in the Serbian media they were reported to be "collateral effects of the fight against terrorism". On 13 March, about 50,000 people demonstrated against the attacks, while on 15 March, the Catholic Church called for masses to be held throughout the region, after which about 15,000 people demonstrated in Pristina.

In late March 1998, more than 100,000 people marched in eight American cities and European capitals to protest the attack. Eventually, events spiralled out of control and the Kosovo War ensued.

See also
 Drenica massacres

References

Sources

 

1998 in Kosovo
Battles involving FR Yugoslavia
Conflicts in 1998
Kosovo Liberation Army
March 1998 events in Europe
Military operations of the Kosovo War